Harpoceras is an extinct genus of ammonite belonging to the family Hildoceratidae. These cephalopods existed in the Jurassic period, during the Toarcian age from the Falciferum zone to the Commune subzone of the Bifrons zone. They were fast-moving nektonic carnivores.

Description
Shells of Harpoceras species show strong dimorphism in their size. While microconchs reach 24–51 mm in diameter, macroconchs shells width is 115–430 mm. They are moderately evolute to involute and compressed. Whorl sides are flat and there is strong keel. Ribs are falcoid or falcate and thus biconcave, strong and projected. Sometimes, ribs can be broad and flat topped on outer part of whorl and in some species they can be striate on inner part of whorl. Some species have midlateral groove, or series of undulating depressions  on inner half of whorl.

Distribution
Fossils of species within this genus have been found in the Lower Jurassic rocks of Europe, Northern Africa, Russia, Japan, Borneo, New Zealand, Indonesia, North and South America (Argentina; El Cholo and Los Molles Formations). Two species, Harpoceras serpentinum and Harpoceras falciferum, are index fossils used for stratigraphic correlation and dating of rocks of the Toarcian stage of the Lower Jurassic.

References

Hildoceratidae
Ammonitida genera
Toarcian life
Early Jurassic ammonites of Europe
Jurassic Germany
Fossils of Germany
Posidonia Shale
Early Jurassic ammonites of North America
Early Jurassic ammonites of South America
Jurassic Argentina
Fossils of Argentina
Neuquén Basin
Early Jurassic ammonites of Asia
Early Jurassic ammonites of Africa
Fossil taxa described in 1869